Tony Wood is a British-Mexican political writer on Russia.

His 2018 book, Russia Without Putin: Money, Power and the Myths of the New Cold War, has been described by U.S. Russia policy expert Richard Lourie as a "maverick book," used "not to build a case against Putin, nor to forecast Russia's fate after his departure", but rather as a "battle cry of the opposition" against a media and public that is 'overly fixated' on the man.  Wood "refutes the idea that today’s standoff is a new Cold War: it lacks any clear ideological dimension," according to Maria Lipman's review, and furthermore, "the kind of capitalism found in Russia today is directly descended from the postcommunist order installed by Putin’s predecessor, Boris Yeltsin. Putin has just consolidated and prolonged Yeltsin’s regime", and the "system will outlast him."

Published works
 Chechnya: The Case for Independence (2007)

References

 
 

Russian political writers
Year of birth missing (living people)
Living people